Richfield is a village in Washington County, Wisconsin. Richfield can also refer to the following towns in Wisconsin:

Richfield, Adams County, Wisconsin
Richfield, Wood County, Wisconsin